Diuris venosa, commonly known as the veined doubletail is a species of orchid which is endemic to New South Wales. It has a few thin, erect leaves and up to four white to lilac-coloured flowers with deep red to purple blotches and lines.

Description

The flowers are white to lilac-coloured with many purple lines and blotches.

Taxonomy and naming
Diuris venosa was first formally described in 1926 by Herman Rupp and the description was published in the journal, Victorian Naturalist. The specific epithet (venosa) is derived from a Latin word meaning "veiny".

Distribution and habitat
This orchid is only found in New South Wales, in the Barrington Tops and New England National Parks, where it grows in swampy, grassy areas.

Conservation
Diuris venosa is listed as "Vulnerable" (VU) under the Australian Government Environment Protection and Biodiversity Conservation Act 1999 (EPBC Act). The threats to its survival include invasion by introduced weeds, particularly English broom (Cytisus scoparius), illegal removal of plants, and predation by feral pigs (Sus scrofa).

References

venosa
Orchids of New South Wales
Endemic orchids of Australia
Plants described in 1926
Taxa named by Herman Rupp